Chodová Planá is a market town in the Tachov District in the Plzeň Region of the Czech Republic. It has about 1,800 inhabitants.

Administrative parts
Villages of Boněnov, Dolní Kramolín, Holubín, Hostíčkov, Michalovy Hory, Pístov and Výškov are administrative parts of Chodová Planá.

Geography
Most of the municipal territory lies in the Teplá Highlands, but the western part with the built-up area lies in the Upper Palatinate Forest Foothills.

There are several ponds in the vicinity of the market town. The largest of them is Regent, a  pond used for sports and recreational purposes. The pond was founded in 1479.

History

The first written mention of Chodová Planá is from 1319, when it was a property of the knights Ctibor and Oldřich. It was then owned by various knights, and in 1391 and 1413 it was documented as the property of the Teplá Abbey. Its owners often changed until 1560, when Chodová Planá was bought by the Širtingar family  (German: Schirnding)

After the Battle of White Mountain in 1620, the properties of the Širtingar family were confiscated, and Chodová Planá was acquired by the counts of Haimhausen. The estate remained in their possession until the abolition of serfdom in 1848. In 1733, a huge fire destroyed half of the market town, including the church.

Until 1938, Chodová Planá had a Jewish community. Its presence is documented by two remaining Jewish cemeteries.

Demographics

Economy

Chodová Planá is known for the oldest brewery in the west Bohemian region, which is named Chodovar. The first written reference of the brewery is from 1573, however, its much older history is evidenced by cellars from the 14th century, carved in granite rock, still used to brew beer.

The brewery is best known today for its beer spa. Guests can soak in a dark lager/mineral water blend in copper tubs. The beer soak spa treatment is said to have medicinal benefits.

Sport
The town has a sports club, TJ Slavoj Chodová Planá.

Sights
The Church of Saint John the Baptist replaced the old one destroyed by the fire. It was built in the Baroque style between 1748 and 1754.

The Old Castle in Chodová Planá from 1734 was rebuilt into the cultural house. The New Castle was built in 1906. It includes a spacious park.

In the brewery, there is a small brewery museum.

Notable people
Johann Emanuel Veith (1787–1876), Roman Catholic preacher

Twin towns – sister cities

Chodová Planá is twinned with:
 Störnstein, Germany

References

External links

 
Populated places in Tachov District
Market towns in the Czech Republic
Jewish communities in the Czech Republic